The Football Conference season of 1988–89 (known as the GM Vauxhall Conference for sponsorship reasons) was the tenth season of the Football Conference.

It was the third season that the champions of the Conference were automatically promoted to the Football League after the abolition of the election system.

Overview
Maidstone United, who had been Conference champions once earlier in the decade and once the runners-up, were finally promoted to the Football League Fourth Division after gaining their second title at this level.

Newport County, the club newly relegated to the Conference from the Football League, were wound up due to debts on 27 February 1989. They were then expelled from the Conference for failing to fulfil their fixtures; their record was expunged.

New teams in the league this season
 Aylesbury United (promoted 1987–88)
 Chorley (promoted 1987–88)
 Newport County (relegated from the Football League 1987–88)
 Yeovil Town (promoted 1987–88)

Final league table

Results

Top scorers

Promotion and relegation

Promoted
 Maidstone United (to the Football League Fourth Division)
 Barrow (from the Northern Premier League)
 Farnborough Town (from the Isthmian League)
 Merthyr Tydfil (from the Southern League)

Relegated
 Aylesbury (to the Isthmian League)
 Darlington (from the Football League Fourth Division)
 Weymouth (to the Southern League)

References

External links
 1988–89 Conference National Results

National League (English football) seasons
5